Laona Township is located in Winnebago County, Illinois. As of the 2010 census, its population was 1,250 and it contained 707 housing units.

Geography

Demographics

Notable people
Merle K. Anderson (1904–1982), farmer and Illinois state representative, was born in Laona Township.
Ellen Gates Starr (1859-1940), social reformer and activist, born in Laona Township.

References

External links
City-data.com
Winnebago County Official Site

1849 establishments in Illinois
Populated places established in 1849
Rockford metropolitan area, Illinois
Townships in Illinois
Townships in Winnebago County, Illinois